Penouille is an iron meteorite found in 1984 in Canada.

History
A small ellipsoidal meteorite of 72g was found in summer 1984 by an eight-year-old boy, Christian Couture of Repentigny, Quebec, on a beach to the seaward side of the Presqu'ile de Penouille, a peninsula in the Baie de Gaspé.

Classification
It is a medium octahedrite, IAB complex.

Fragments
Terrestrial oxidation, abrasion and corrosion of this meteorite were not extensive and the fall is thought to have been relatively recent. The main mass is conserved at the Planetarium de Montreal, Canada.

See also
 Glossary of meteoritics

References

Bibliography
Meteoritical Bulletin 78
Meteoritics 30

Meteorites found in Canada
Gaspé Peninsula